The Kesler Covered Bridge, near Homer, Georgia, was built in 1925.  It was listed on the National Register of Historic Places in 1975.

It is unusual for having a Kingpost truss on one side and a Queenpost truss on the other.

It was a work of construction foreman Robert Verner and workers Eugene Vaughn, J. A. Kesler, Grady Crump and Daye Crump.  It is named for the Kesler family.

References

Covered bridges in Georgia (U.S. state)
National Register of Historic Places in Banks County, Georgia
Bridges completed in 1925